The following is a list of stars in the Argo Navis constellation.

See also
List of stars by constellation

Notes

References

Argo Navis
Argo Navis